Veliki Brebrovnik is a dispersed settlement in the Slovene Hills northeast of Ormož in northeastern Slovenia. The area belongs to the traditional region of Styria. It is now included in the Drava Statistical Region.

There is a small roadside chapel in the southern part of the settlement. It is dedicated to Our Lady of Lourdes and was built in 1908.

References

External links
 Veliki Brebrovnik on Geopedia

Populated places in the Municipality of Ormož